Nairobi West is a neighbourhood in the city of Nairobi.

Overview
It straddles the Lang'ata Road, Mombasa Road and Uhuru Highway junction. It borders the South C estate to the south.

Nairobi West is zoned as a high density residential neighbourhood, with mixed residential developments such as bungalows, flats as well as maisonettes. Over the years the neighbourhood has morphed into a commercial and residential neighbourhood due to the number of entertainment joints irregularly opened in the area. It was a neighbourhood that is home to the middle class segment of Nairobi residents.

Points of interest
 Nyayo National Stadium, a multipurpose stadium built in 1983 for a capacity of 15,000.

References

 

Suburbs of Nairobi